Nicolò Bianchi (born 24 February 1992) is an Italian football player. He plays for  club Cesena.

Club career
He spent the first nine seasons of his senior career in the third-tier Serie C.

On 12 July 2019, he signed a two-year contract with Reggina. At the end of the 2019–20 season Reggina was promoted to Serie B. He made his Serie B debut for Reggina on 26 September 2020 in a game against Salernitana, as a starter. On June 14, 2021, it was announced that he extended his contract with Reggina for another two years.

On 12 July 2022, Bianchi signed a two-year contract with Cesena.

References

External links
 

1992 births
Sportspeople from Como
Living people
Italian footballers
Association football midfielders
Novara F.C. players
Calcio Foggia 1920 players
Giulianova Calcio players
U.S. Alessandria Calcio 1912 players
A.C. Monza players
U.S. Cremonese players
Bassano Virtus 55 S.T. players
L.R. Vicenza players
Reggina 1914 players
Cesena F.C. players
Serie B players
Serie C players
Footballers from Lombardy